Abraham Almonte (born June 27, 1989) is a Dominican professional baseball outfielder in the New York Mets organization. He has previously played in Major League Baseball (MLB) for the Seattle Mariners, Cleveland Indians, Kansas City Royals, Arizona Diamondbacks, San Diego Padres, Atlanta Braves, and Boston Red Sox.

The New York Yankees initially signed Almonte as a free agent. Before the 2013 season, he was traded to the Mariners for Shawn Kelley. Almonte was first called up to the major leagues at the end of August 2013.

Early life
Almonte was born in Santo Domingo, Dominican Republic. When he was 16, his professional career began with the New York Yankees, as they signed him and brought him to the United States to play baseball.

Career

New York Yankees
After being signed in 2005, was assigned to play in the Dominican Summer League (DSL) for the DSL Yankees. Almonte started his professional career as a second baseman, but was transitioned to outfield due to his speed and the organization's need for young outfielders. In 63 DSL games, he batted .254 with 26 runs batted in (RBIs), eight home runs, and a .409 on-base percentage (OBP), .450 slugging percentage (SLG), and a .859 on-base plus slugging (OPS). The following season in 2007, Almonte was promoted to the Yankees' Gulf Coast League team, where he excelled with a .288 batting average in 49 games. Over the next two seasons (2008-2009), Almonte played for the Charleston RiverDogs of the Class A South Atlantic League. In 2009, Almonte batted .288 with 56 RBIs in 115 games. In 2010, shortly after being promoted to the Tampa Yankees of the Class A-Advanced Florida State League, played only 15 games before undergoing surgery to repair a torn right labrum. He came back healthy in 2011 for Tampa, and reached a 34-game hit streak midseason. Almonte's performance earned him a promotion to the Trenton Thunder of the Double-A Eastern League. In 78 games, he batted .276 with four home runs and 25 RBIs.

Seattle Mariners

On February 13, 2013, the Yankees traded Almonte to the Seattle Mariners for relief pitcher Shawn Kelley. Once becoming a Mariner, Almonte was first sent to the Jackson Generals of the Class AA Southern League. While there, he hit .255 with 18 RBIs and 4 home runs in 29 games before impressing the organization enough to be called up to Triple-A with the Tacoma Rainiers. Almonte spent the majority of the 2013 campaign with the Tacoma Rainers, playing in 94 games and batting .314 with 50 RBIs, 11 home runs, and a. 403 OBP, .491 SLG and an .894 OPS. These numbers were good enough to give Almonte a shot at the MLB level, as he was called up on August 30, 2013, and made his debut for the Seattle Mariners against the Houston Astros on the road in Houston, Texas. On September 9, Almonte hit his first major league home run against Astros' relief pitcher Chia Jen Lo.

Almonte began the 2014 regular season as the starting center fielder and leadoff hitter for the Mariners. Almonte played in 27 games early in the 2014 campaign, and struggled to produce at the major league level, only batting a mere .198 with eight RBIs, 40 strikeouts and a .248 OBP and .292 SLG. To halt the skid and rejuvenate the Mariners lineup, Almonte was optioned to Triple-A on May 5. Overall in part of two seasons with Seattle, Almonte appeared in 52 MLB games, batting .225 with three home runs and 17 RBIs.

San Diego Padres

On July 31, 2014, the Mariners traded Almonte and Stephen Kohlscheen to the San Diego Padres for Chris Denorfia. With the Padres through the remainder of the season, Almonte batted .265 in 32 games. During 2015, Almonte appeared in 31 games for San Diego, compiling a .204 batting average.

Cleveland Indians
On July 31, 2015, the Padres traded Almonte to the Cleveland Indians for Marc Rzepczynski. On August 8, 2015, Almonte was called up from the Columbus Clippers to start in center field. Almonte was suspended for 80 games on February 26, 2016, after testing positive for boldenone. Almonte was injured through portions of the 2017 season with the Indians, finishing with a .233 batting average and 3 home runs. He was designated for assignment on March 29, 2018.

In parts of three seasons with Cleveland, Almonte batted .254 with nine home runs and 56 RBIs in 187 games.

Kansas City Royals
Almonte was claimed by the Kansas City Royals on April 2, 2018. In 50 games with the Royals, be batted .179 with three home runs and nine RBIs. On July 16, he was designated for assignment and released a few days later.

Arizona Diamondbacks
On November 6, 2018, Almonte signed a minor league deal with the Arizona Diamondbacks. Almonte spent the 2019 minor league season with the Reno Aces. On September 1, 2019, the Diamondbacks selected Almonte's contract. In 17 MLB games with Arizona, Almonte batted .290 with one home run and four RBIs. He was outrighted off of the 40-man roster by the Diamondbacks on October 31, and elected free agency on November 4.

San Diego Padres (second stint)
On January 4, 2020, Almonte signed a minor league deal with the San Diego Padres. On August 3, the Padres selected Almonte's contract to the active roster. In seven games with the Padres, Almonte batted 1-for-11 (.091). He was designated for assignment on October 6 and elected free agency on October 8.

Atlanta Braves
On October 30, 2020, Almonte signed a major league contract with the Atlanta Braves. On March 27, 2021, Almonte was outrighted off of the 40-man roster. and assigned to the alternate training site. On May 31, Almonte was selected to the active roster. Almonte appeared in 64 games for the Braves, hitting .216 with five home runs and 19 RBIs. On August 27, 2021, Almonte was designated for assignment by the Braves. On September 3, Almonte cleared waivers and elected free agency.

Milwaukee Brewers
On October 15, 2021, Almonte signed a minor-league contract with the Milwaukee Brewers. In 48 games during 2022 with the Triple-A Nashville Sounds, he batted .294 with 11 home runs and 42 RBIs. He did not appear in a major-league game for Milwaukee.

Boston Red Sox
On July 25, 2022, Almonte was traded to the Boston Red Sox for cash considerations. He was assigned to the Triple-A Worcester Red Sox. Almonte was added to Boston's active roster on September 7, and he appeared as a pinch hitter for the team that evening. He appeared in 15 games with the Red Sox through the end of the season, batting .257 with one home run and two RBIs. He also played in 32 games for Worcester, batting .291 with seven home runs and 24 RBIs. On October 11, Almonte was designated for assignment. He elected free agency four days later.

New York Mets
On December 16, 2022, Almonte signed a minor league deal with the New York Mets.

Personal life

Alcohol abuse and sobriety
In 2007 after the death of his father, Almonte began drinking alcohol on a daily basis to cope with his grief. As a teenager living in New York, Almonte would regularly go out to clubs on weekdays and drink all night prior to his training the next day. His alcohol addiction remained somewhat harmless until 2010. During the start of the Yankees' 2010 Campaign, Almonte was the team's starting second baseman for his minor league club. 15 games into the season Almonte tore his labrum in his right shoulder which would require surgery. With more time away from baseball than ever before, Almonte found more time to drink, which he would do even more frequently. The addiction became something that Almonte was aware of and wanted to put an end to, but the cravings were too strong and he didn't know how to stop them.

It wasn't until 2011 that Almonte was able to address and overcome his addiction. He credits the power of God as the thing that was able to make him realize alcohol was ruining his life. Almonte started regularly attending church and was able to make more time for family and friends. After only a month of sobriety, Almonte lost  and rejuvenated his baseball career.

Faith
Almonte has openly claimed that his faith holds the key to his success. "God has something bigger," Almonte said in an interview with The News Tribune. "He is going to keep using me up here in the big leagues. No matter where they send me – big leagues, minor leagues, home, wherever they send me – I know I'm going to do whatever God wants me to do. Baseball or no baseball, if I do it to glorify God's name, I think I'll be OK."

See also
List of Major League Baseball players suspended for performance-enhancing drugs

References

External links

 

1989 births
Living people
Arizona Diamondbacks players
Atlanta Braves players
Boston Red Sox players
Charleston RiverDogs players
Cleveland Indians players
Columbus Clippers players
Dominican Republic Christians
Dominican Republic expatriate baseball players in the United States
Dominican Republic sportspeople in doping cases
Dominican Summer League Yankees players
El Paso Chihuahuas players
Gulf Coast Yankees players
Jackson Generals (Southern League) players
Kansas City Royals players
Leones del Escogido players
Major League Baseball outfielders
Major League Baseball players from the Dominican Republic
Major League Baseball players suspended for drug offenses
Reno Aces players
San Diego Padres players
Seattle Mariners players
Sportspeople from Santo Domingo
Tacoma Rainiers players
Tampa Yankees players
Trenton Thunder players
Arizona League Diamondbacks players
Gwinnett Stripers players
Worcester Red Sox players
Toros del Este players
Nashville Sounds players